The Eurovision Young Musicians 1994 was the seventh edition of the Eurovision Young Musicians, held at the Philharmonic Concert Hall in Warsaw, Poland, afterwards the last year's contest, winning country, Bartłomiej Nizioł performing the violin instrument, dated between the 9 and 14 June 1994. Organised by the European Broadcasting Union (EBU) and host broadcaster Telewizja Polska (TVP), musicians from eight countries participated in the televised final. A total of twenty-four countries took part in the competition therefore a semi-final was held in the same venue on 9 and 10 June 1994. Out of the 24 countries, 16 did not qualify to the final, including the host country Poland. All participants performed a classical piece of their choice accompanied by the Warsaw Symphony Orchestra, conducted by Kazimierz Kord.

Nine countries made their début, while five countries returned (France, Greece, Ireland, Portugal, Sweden) and Yugoslavia withdrew from the 1994 contest. It is, to date, the contest with the most contestants and the one closest to matching the number of participants in that same year's Eurovision Song Contest, with 24 to the Song Contest's 25. It also had the most overlap of any year, as all but five countries also competed in that year's Song Contest (the exceptions being Belgium, Denmark, and Slovenia, who had been relegated from the 1994 contest, and Latvia and Macedonia, who would not debut there for several years; Bosnia and Herzegovina, Iceland, Malta, the Netherlands, Romania, and Slovakia didn't appear at the 1994 Young Musicians, but all save for Iceland would debut or return in the coming years).

The non-qualified countries were Austria, Belgium, Croatia, Cyprus, France, Germany, Greece, Ireland, Lithuania, Macedonia, Norway, Poland, Portugal, Russia, Slovenia and Spain. For the third time, the host country did not qualify for the final. Natalie Clein of the United Kingdom won the contest, with Latvia and Sweden placing second and third respectively.

Location

Philharmonic Concert Hall in Warsaw, Poland, was the host venue for the 1994 edition of the Eurovision Young Musicians. The building was built between 1900 and 1901, under the direction of Karol Kozłowski, to be reconstructed in 1955 by Eugeniusz Szparkowski. The director of the institution is Wojciech Nowak. It is the main venue of the Warsaw National Philharmonic Orchestra.

Since 1955, the institution organises the International Chopin Piano Competition. The building hosts the annual festival Warsaw Autumn.

Results

Semi final
A total of twenty-four countries took part in the semi final of the 1994 contest, of which eight qualified to the televised grand final. The following countries failed to qualify.

Final
Awards were given to the top three countries. The table below highlights these using gold, silver, and bronze. The placing results of the remaining participants is unknown and never made public by the European Broadcasting Union.

Jury members
The jury members consisted of the following:

 – Henryk Mikolaj Gorecki (president)
 – Marc Grauwels
 – Arie Dzierlatka
 – Emma Johnson
 – Frantisek Maxian
 – Jorma Panula
 – Carole Dawn Reinhart
 – Alfredo Riccardi
 – Wanda Wilkomirska

Broadcasting
EBU members from the following countries broadcast the final round.

Official album

7th Eurovision Competition For Young Musicians was the official compilation album of the 1994 Contest, put together by the European Broadcasting Union and released by the host broadcaster TVP shortly after the contest in June 1994. The album featured live recordings of all 24 participants including those who took part in the semi-final round, divided into 2 separate CDs.

See also
 Eurovision Song Contest 1994

References

External links 
 

Eurovision Young Musicians by year
1994 in music
1994 in Polish music
Music festivals in Poland
Events in Warsaw
June 1994 events in Europe